The FM Towns is a fourth generation home computer developed and manufactured by Fujitsu, first released only in Japan on 28 February, 1989. It was the fourth computer to be released under the Fujitsu brand, succeeding the FM-7 series. The following list contains all of the known games released commercially for the FM Towns platform.

Featuring an operating system based on MS-DOS called Towns OS, the FM Towns operates with both 3.5" floppy disks and CD-ROMs. Many add-ons were released including networking, SCSI, memory upgrades and CPU enhancements, among others that increased the performance of the system. A fifth-generation home video game console based on the FM Towns computer called FM Towns Marty was released exclusively for the Japanese market on 20 February 1993, featuring backward-compatibility with older FM Towns titles. Multiple revisions were later released that included several changes compared to the original model, with the last model being released in 1995 before being officially discontinued in the market on Summer 1997. A total of 500,000 FM Towns units were reportedly sold during its commercial life span, while 45,000 FM Towns Marty consoles were sold as of  31 December 1993.

Games 
There are currently  games on this list.

See also 
 Lists of video games

Notes

References

External links 
 List of FM Towns games at MobyGames

Fujitsu lists
FM Towns
FM Towns games